Andrés "Andy" Muschietti (born August 26, 1973) is an Argentine filmmaker who achieved wide recognition with the 2013 film Mama which he made with Neil Cross and his sister, producer and screenwriter Barbara Muschietti, based on their three-minute film of the same name. The short, which he made at age 35, had attracted the attention of Guillermo del Toro, who then served as executive producer on the feature adaptation. 

He gained further recognition for directing both films in the It film series, the first being the 2017 film adaptation of the Stephen King novel It, which became the highest-grossing horror film of all time, and the second being its 2019 second part, It Chapter Two. Both are distributed by Warner Bros. Pictures and produced by New Line Cinema.

Muschietti is set to direct two upcoming films, also for Warner Bros.: The Flash starring Ezra Miller, set in the DC Extended Universe, and a live-action adaptation of Attack on Titan. He is also set to direct a remake of The Howling for Netflix.

Early life 
Muschietti was born and raised in Vicente López, Buenos Aires and has one older sister, Barbara Muschietti. Both he and his sister studied at Fundación Universidad del Cine. He worked as a storyboard artist during his early years in the food industry.

Career
In 2013, Muschietti directed his debut film, the supernatural horror Mama, which he co-wrote with Neil Cross and his sister Barbara Muschietti, with the latter also acting as producer. It was based on Muschietti's three-minute short film Mamá, which attracted Guillermo del Toro, who stated that it had the "scariest" scenes he had "ever seen." The short convinced del Toro to executive produce the feature-length film, which starred Jessica Chastain, Nikolaj Coster-Waldau, Megan Charpentier and Isabelle Nelisse, and was released by Universal Pictures on January 18, 2013. The film grossed more than $146 million and had a budget of $15 million.

In September 2013, Universal hired Muschietti for a reboot of The Mummy franchise, but he left the project in May 2014 due to creative differences with Jon Spaihts' draft of the script.

In July 2015, after the departure of Cary Joji Fukunaga, Muschietti was hired by New Line Cinema to direct It, the two-part adaptation of the Stephen King novel. Barbara produced along with Dan Lin, Roy Lee, Seth Grahame-Smith and David Katzenberg. The films were released in 2017 and 2019, respectively.

In April 2021, both Andy and Barbara Muschietti formed their own production company called Double Dream, with The Flash serving as the company’s first project.

Previously announced projects
In February 2013, Universal Pictures announced Muschietti would direct the film adaptation of the Josh Malerman novel Bird Box, which Scott Stuber, Chris Morgan and Barbara would produce, with Eric Heisserer set to write the script. In January 2014, Muschietti was reportedly among front-runners to direct a He-Man film for Warner Bros. Pictures, a remake of Masters of the Universe. In June 2014, Deadline reported that Muschietti was on the shortlist of directors to direct a sequel to the fantasy film Snow White and the Huntsman for Universal. In September 2014, Sony Pictures named Muschietti to direct the film adaptation of Shadow of the Colossus after Josh Trank left due to a commitment to an upcoming Star Wars spin-off. Barbara would co-produce the film with Kevin Misher, with Seth Lochhead set to write the screenplay.

In February 2015, Deadline reported that Sony was looking to hire Muschietti to direct a live-action Robotech project, with Gianni Nunnari and Mark Canton attached to produce, and Michael B. Gordon as screenwriter. In March 2015, Plan B Entertainment optioned the film rights to Stephen King's short story "The Jaunt" from the Skeleton Crew collection, with Muschietti to direct and Barbara attached as producer.

In September 2017, Deadline reported that Muschietti was attached to a film version of the book Dracul.

In December 2017, it was announced that Muschietti will produce alongside his sister, Barbara the adaptation of the sci-fi novel The Electric Slate by Simon Stålenhag to be directed by the Russo brothers.

On October 29, 2018, it was announced that Muschietti will be directing a Warner Bros. live-action film reboot of Attack on Titan.

In July 2019, Warner Bros. was looking to hire Muschietti to direct a DC Extended Universe film The Flash. In August 2019, Muschietti confirmed that The Flash will be his next project. The Flash is scheduled to be released on June 16, 2023.

In August 2019, Muschietti was announced to produce the film adaptation of Roadwork from Stephen King with Pablo Trapero directing.

In January 2020, Muschietti was announced to be directing a remake of The Howling for Netflix.

Personal life
Muschietti's sister, Barbara Muschietti, is also a film writer and producer. He is of Italian-Argentine ancestry.

Filmography

Other credits

Awards and nominations

References

External links

 
 
 

1973 births
Living people
People from Buenos Aires
Argentine people of Italian descent
Argentine film directors
Argentine screenwriters
Horror film directors